|}

The Balanchine Stakes, also known as the Airlie Stud Stakes, is a Group 2 flat horse race in Ireland open to two-year-old thoroughbred fillies. It is run at the Curragh over a distance of 6 furlongs (1,207 metres), and it is scheduled to take place each year in late June or early July.

The event's registered title honours Balanchine, a successful filly whose victories included the Irish Derby in 1994. The race was established in 2005, and it was originally classed at Listed level. The first two runnings were contested over 7 furlongs.

The race's distance was cut to 6 furlongs in 2007, and for a period it was known as the Saoire Stakes. It reverted to its former name in 2009, and from this point its sponsored title was the Ballygallon Stud Stakes.

The Balanchine Stakes was promoted to Group 3 status in 2011. In 2019 the race received a further boost when it was one of 3 Group 3 race's across Europe promoted to Group 2 status following the European Pattern Committee's review for 2019. It is now sponsored by Airlie Stud, and it is held on the second day of the Curragh's three-day Irish Derby Festival meeting, as part of the supporting card to the Group 1 Pretty Polly Stakes.

Records

Leading jockey (5 wins):

 Ryan Moore - Most Beautiful (2015), Roly Poly (2016), Clemmie (2017), So Perfect (2018), Statuette (2022)

Leading trainer (7 wins):
 Aidan O'Brien - Listen (2007), Bye Bye Birdie (2013), I Am Beautiful (2014), Roly Poly (2016), Clemmie (2017), So Perfect (2018), Statuette (2022)

Winners

See also
 Horse racing in Ireland
 List of Irish flat horse races

References

 Racing Post:

 horseracingintfed.com – International Federation of Horseracing Authorities – Grangecon Stud Stakes (2018).

Flat races in Ireland
Curragh Racecourse
Flat horse races for two-year-old fillies
Recurring sporting events established in 2005
2005 establishments in Ireland